Hello Rockview is the third studio album by ska punk band Less Than Jake, released on October 6, 1998. Produced by Howard Benson, it is the band's second and final album on Capitol Records, and recorded at Mirror Image Studios in Gainesville, Florida. The album is the first to feature trombonist Pete Anna, who joined the band during its recording. The album is dedicated in memory of Niki Wood.

The album yielded two singles, "History of a Boring Town" and "All My Best Friends Are Metalheads", with "History of a Boring Town" reaching #39 on the Billboard Modern Rock Tracks Chart.

Writing and composition
The lyrics of Hello Rockview follow four years of drummer and lyricist Vinnie Fiorello's life when arranged in a non-studio order and is named after one of Vinnie's oldest friends who was imprisoned at Rockview State Correctional Institution.

Artwork
The CD booklet had the unorthodox format of a comic book. It was illustrated by Steve Vance, who would later illustrate the song artwork for "The Ghosts of Me and You" on Anthem. Stylistically, it is similar to Dick Tracy. Each page is a separate song, with all dialog, thoughts, and captions being the lyrics to each song. The lyrics themselves all appear in proper order, but the order of the individual songs is different from that of the track list.

Reception

NME listed the album as one of "20 Pop Punk Albums Which Will Make You Nostalgic", saying that it is "A soundtrack to shoving your friends, listening to 'All My Best Friends Are Metalheads' and wondering how you ever liked pop punk which didn't have a trombone." Cleveland.com ranked "All My Friends are Metalheads" at number 58 on their list of the top 100 pop-punk songs.

Track listing
"Last One Out of Liberty City" – 2:01
"Help Save the Youth of America from Exploding" – 2:53
"All My Best Friends Are Metalheads" – 3:31
"Five State Drive" – 2:48
"Nervous in the Alley" – 2:54
"Motto" – 3:14
"History of a Boring Town" – 3:22
"Great American Sharpshooter" – 1:28
"Danny Says" – 2:51
"Big Crash" – 2:43
"Theme Song for H Street" – 2:43
"Richard Allen George... No, It's Just Cheez" – 1:46
"Scott Farcas Takes It on the Chin" – 2:34
"Al's War" – 3:04

(some versions of "Hello Rockview" came with a bonus disc of Less Than Jake's 1996 release "Losing Streak")

Personnel
Less Than Jake
 Chris Demakes - vocals, guitar
 Roger Manganelli - vocals, bass
 Vinnie Fiorello - drums, lyrics
 Buddy Schaub - trombone
 Pete Anna - trombone
 Derron Nuhfer - saxophone

Additional musicians
 Howard Benson - additional keyboards

Production
 Howard Benson - producer, editing
 Less Than Jake - producer
 Steve Kravac - engineer
Ronny Cates - assistant engineer
 Chris Lord-Alge - mixing
 Mike - assistant mixing engineer
Terry - assistant mixing engineer
Bob Ludwig - mastering
Danny O'Bryan - production coordination
Steve Vance - illustration and design
Less Than Jake - art direction

Chart positions

References

1998 albums
Less Than Jake albums
Albums produced by Howard Benson
Capitol Records albums
Concept albums